Antonio da San Gimignano (died 1496) was a Roman Catholic prelate who served as Bishop of Bagnoregio (1488–1496).

Biography
On 21 May 1488, Antonio da San Gimignano was appointed during the papacy of Pope Innocent VIII as Bishop of Bagnoregio. 
He served as Bishop of Bagnoregio until his death which is listed as 1496 or 1497.

While bishop, he was the principal consecrator of Henri d'Aradon, Auxiliary Bishop of Vannes (1490), and Gaspard de Toriglia, Bishop of Santa Giusta (1494).

References

External links and additional sources
 (for Chronology of Bishops) 
 (for Chronology of Bishops) 

15th-century Italian Roman Catholic bishops
1496 deaths
Bishops appointed by Pope Innocent VIII